Phiala specialis is a moth in the family Eupterotidae. It was described by Lars Kühne in 2007. It is found in Cameroon and the Democratic Republic of the Congo.

References

Moths described in 2007
Eupterotinae